Tamara Desni (22 October 19137 February 2008) was a German-born British actress She appeared in films in the 1930s and 1940s.

Biography
Desni was born in Berlin as Tamara Brodsky, the daughter of actress Xenia Desni. Her mother was born in Kiev, Russian Empire and emigrated to Germany some time before Desni's birth. She became a star of German cinema during the silent era.

She studied ballet as a child and appeared on stage and in several German films. She married a dentist while a teenager, although they divorced before Desni landed her first London acting role in 1931 in the musical White Horse Inn. She followed this up with another leading role in the musical Casanova, featuring music by Johann Strauss, Jr.

Desni's film career took off in 1933 with Falling for You, and continued through 1950. Other film credits include Dick Barton at Bay, The Torso Murder Mystery, Fire Over England, and Hell's Cargo.

Marriages
She met her second husband, actor Bruce Seton, on the set of Blue Smoke in 1934. They married in Hendon in March 1937, but divorced in 1940. She next married film producer Roland (Bill) Gillett, though that marriage was dissolved before the end of World War II. Her fourth marriage was to the Canadian-born actor Raymond Lovell in 1947, the two separating in 1951. Her stepdaughter during this short marriage was the actress Simone Lovell.

In France, she met Albert Lavagna, a builder. They built the popular inn 'L'Auberge Chez Tamara', marrying in 1956, shortly after Desni discovered she was pregnant for the first time. They had two daughters.

Death
Desni's health began declining while in her late eighties. She died, a widow, on 7 February 2008 in Valence d'Agen, France, aged 94.

Filmography

References

External links
 
 Tamara Desni obituary at  telegraph.co.uk
 Photographs of Tamara Desni

1913 births
2008 deaths
British film actresses
German expatriates in France
German film actresses
Actresses from Berlin
20th-century British actresses
20th-century German actresses
German people of Ukrainian descent
German emigrants to the United Kingdom